Monheurt is a commune in the Lot-et-Garonne department in south-western France.

It is located on the left (western) bank of the river Garonne, 6 km south of Tonneins.

See also
Communes of the Lot-et-Garonne department

References

Communes of Lot-et-Garonne